The word tundish originates from a shallow wooden dish with an outlet channel, fitting into the bunghole of a tun or cask and forming a kind of funnel for filling it. These were originally used in brewing. 

In general, any tundish will accept flow and store a small amount of material, while dispensing material elsewhere, similar to a funnel. In contrast to a funnel, the purpose is generally to regulate flow, and achieve a more steady output with intermittent inputs, and the tundish typically will take on a different shape.

Plumbing 
The term tundish is still used today in plumbing, where a funnel or hopper is filled by an outlet pipe above it. This is often provided for intermittent overflows, or where an air gap is required, to avoid possible back-contamination.

Metal Casting 
In metal casting, a tundish is a broad, open container with one or more holes in the bottom. It is used to feed molten metal into an ingot mould to avoid splashing and give a smoother flow. The tundish allows a reservoir of metal to feed the casting machine while ladles are switched, thus acting as a buffer of hot metal, as well as smoothing out flow, regulating metal feed to the moulds and cleaning the metal. Metallic remains left inside a tundish are known as tundish skulls and need to be removed, typically by mechanical means (scraping, cutting). A casting tundish is lined with refractory bricks specific to the liquid metal which is being cast. A tundish preheater may improve performance by heating the refractory before pouring metal, and may allow removal of molten oxide and skull material while preheating.

References

External links 

Casting (manufacturing)